Parliamentary elections were held in Ukraine on 21 July 2019. Originally scheduled to be held at the end of October, the elections were brought forward after newly inaugurated President Volodymyr Zelenskyy dissolved parliament on 21 May 2019, during his inauguration. The elections resulted in an outright majority, a novelty in Ukraine, for Zelenskyy's Servant of the People party, which won 254 seats.

About 80 percent of the elected candidates were new to parliament; 83 deputies managed to get reelected from the previous parliament and 13 deputies from earlier convocations. All deputies from Servant of the People were political newcomers. 61 percent of the new MPs had never before been engaged in politics.

Out of 225 constituencies, 26 were suspended due to the March 2014 annexation of Crimea by Russia and the ongoing occupation of parts of Donetsk Oblast and Luhansk Oblast by separatist forces of the self-declared Donetsk People's Republic and Luhansk People's Republic (since April 2014).

Background
Originally scheduled to be held at the end of October 2019, the 2019 Ukrainian parliamentary elections were brought forward after newly inaugurated President Volodymyr Zelenskyy dissolved parliament early on 21 May 2019 (a day after his inauguration), despite claims that he did not have the legal grounds to do this. After Zelenskyy issued the decree (calling early elections), a lawsuit was filed to the Constitutional Court of Ukraine, which sought to declare the decree unconstitutional and therefore illegal. The court declared the decree to be legal on 20 June 2019. The official reason why Zelenskyy dissolved parliament was "a lack of a government coalition".

Following the 2014 parliamentary elections, the Petro Poroshenko Bloc (PPB) party became the largest party, after securing 132 seats. On 21 November 2014, the Petro Poroshenko Bloc, People's Front, Self Reliance, Fatherland and the Radical Party all signed a coalition agreement. Arseniy Yatsenyuk became Prime Minister on 2 December 2014. The Radical Party left the coalition on 1 September 2015 in protest over a vote in parliament involving a change to the Ukrainian Constitution that would lead to decentralization and greater powers for areas held by separatists. February 2016 saw the start of the fall of the Yatsenyuk cabinet after the economy minister Aivaras Abromavičius announced his resignation claiming the government did not have real commitment to fight corruption. On 17 and 18 February 2016, the Fatherland and Self Reliance parties left the coalition; meaning that the coalition became 5 deputies short of the 226 needed. On 14 April 2016, Volodymyr Groysman became the new Prime Minister and the Groysman government began with a new cabinet of ministers.
Due to the short period of time available to organize the 2019 parliamentary election, current Ukrainian public procurement laws were not followed and to bypass this, local election commissions will work under deferred payment.

Electoral system

Under current law 225 members of the Verkhovna Rada are elected by nationwide closed party-list proportional representation with 5% electoral election threshold and the other 225 seats elected in constituencies with a first-past-the-post electoral system in one round (candidate with the highest vote total wins). 21 parties take part in the election in the nationwide party-list. For the elections there was established a state financing for all political parties that received 2% support, but on 2 October 2019 that law was canceled.

Out of 225 constituencies, 26 are suspended due to the March 2014 annexation of Crimea by Russia and the occupation of parts of Donetsk Oblast and Luhansk Oblast by separatists (since April 2014).

Candidates had until 20 June to submit documents to the Central Election Commission of Ukraine to register as candidates for the position of deputy of the Verkhovna Rada. On 25 June 2019, the Central Election Commission ended its registration process. It registered 5,845 candidates for the elections: 3,171 candidates in the single-member constituencies and 2,674 candidates in the single nationwide constituency with 22 parties.

Since 2014, various politicians have proposed to reform the electoral system to 100% party-list proportional representation with open lists. President Zelenskyy is the main proponent. The proposal is opposed by Yulia Tymoshenko. A vote on the proposal (authored by the president) was supposed to take place on 22 May 2019, but members of parliament voted against including it in the agenda.

Contesting parties

List of registered parties

 Opposition Bloc (Evgeny Muraev)
 Strength and Honor (Ihor Smeshko)
 Fatherland (Yulia Tymoshenko)
 Patriot (Mykola Holomsha)
 Power of the People (Oleksandr Solotai)
 Opposition Platform — For Life (Yuriy Boyko / Vadim Rabinovich) 
 Party of Greens of Ukraine (Tetyana Bodun)
 Torch (Tetyana Odnoroh)
 Self Reliance (Andriy Sadovyi)
 European Solidarity (Petro Poroshenko)
 Ukrainian Strategy of Groysman (Volodymyr Groysman)
 Civil Position (Anatoliy Hrytsenko)
 Social Justice (Alla Shlapak)
 Servant of the People (Dmytro Razumkov)
 Power of the Law (formerly Hope) (Andriy Senchenko)
 Radical Party of Oleh Lyashko (Oleh Lyashko)
 Party of Shariy (Anatoly Shariy)
 Voice (Svyatoslav Vakarchuk)
 Independence (Anatolii Mohyliov)
 Agrarian Party of Ukraine (Mykhailo Poplavskyi)
 Freedom (Oleh Tyahnybok)
 Movement of New Forces (Mikheil Saakashvili)

Opinion polls

Results

The 46 independents included four members of Our Land, three members of UKROP, one member of Agrarian Party of Ukraine and one member of the For Specific Cases party, who had not been nominated by their parties.

Electoral support for parties

Single-mandate constituency results 

About 80 percent of the elected candidates had never been elected to parliament; 83 deputies managed to get reelected from the previous parliament and 13 deputies from earlier convocations. All deputies from Servant of the People were political newcomers. 61 percent of the new MPs had never before been engaged in politics.

References

External links

Official website of the Central Election Commission of Ukraine 

Parliamentary elections in Ukraine
Ukraine
Parliamentary
Parliamentary
9th Ukrainian Verkhovna Rada